Las Gallinas Valley or Gallinas Valley is a geographical valley landform of Marin County, California, United States formed by Miller Creek.  It is also the name of a major planning area of Marin County.

References

Valleys of Marin County, California